The 2011 Aberto de São Paulo was a professional tennis tournament played on hard courts. It was the eleventh edition of the tournament which was part of the 2011 ATP Challenger Tour. It took place in São Paulo, Brazil between 3 and 9 January 2011.

Singles main-draw entrants

Seeds

 Rankings are as of December 27, 2010.

Other entrants
The following players received wildcards into the singles main draw:
  Daniel Dutra da Silva
  Christian Lindell
  Tiago Lopes
  Fernando Romboli

The following players received entry from the qualifying draw:
  Rafael Camilo
  Henrique Cunha
  Gastão Elias
  André Ghem

Champions

Singles

 Ricardo Mello def.  Rafael Camilo, 6–2, 6–1

Doubles

 Franco Ferreiro /  André Sá def.  Santiago González /  Horacio Zeballos, 7–5, 7–6(12)

External links
Official Website
ITF Search
ATP official site

Prime Cup Aberto de Sao Paulo
Hard court tennis tournaments
Tennis tournaments in Brazil
Aberto de São Paulo
Prime Cup Aberto de São Paulo
Prime Cup Aberto de São Paulo